The 1980 Indiana gubernatorial election was held on November 4, 1980 in all 92 counties in the state of Indiana. Otis Bowen, the state's incumbent governor was ineligible for a third consecutive term due to term limits set forth in the Indiana Constitution. Robert D. Orr, the state's incumbent Republican lieutenant governor, was elected to his first term, defeating John A. Hillenbrand II, and a minor party challenger.

Democratic primary

Candidates

Announced

John A. Hillenbrand II, businessman
Wayne Townsend, state senator

Declined

Floyd Fithian, United States Representative from 2nd District

Two candidates emerged to contest the Democratic gubernatorial nomination in 1980. These were John A. Hillenbrand, a businessman from Batesville, Indiana, and Wayne Townsend, who had previously served three terms in the Indiana State Senate. Hillenbrand defeated Townsend by a relatively narrow margin of 26,403 votes, or less than five percent of all votes cast. Townsend would go on to win the Democratic nomination for governor in 1984.

Results

General election

References 

1980 Indiana elections
1980
Indiana
November 1980 events in the United States